The Zanaki are a Bantu ethnolinguistic group from the heart of Mara Region, Tanzania, to the east of Lake Victoria.  The group is subdivided into the Birus and the Buturis.

Notable people
Julius Nyerere (1922–1999), the founder and first president of Tanzania was a Zanaki and was the son of the King Burito Nyerere (1860–1942), who was chief of the Zanaki, and of Christina Mgaya wa Nyang'ombe (1891-1997).
David Musuguri (*1923), Chief of the Tanzania People's Defence Force 1980–1988
 Joseph Sinde Warioba served as Prime Minister of Tanzania from 1985 to 1990. Furthermore, he served concurrently as the country's Vice President. He has also served as a judge on the East African Court of Justice, and as chairman of the Tanzanian Constitutional Review Commission since 2012

References

 

Bantu peoples
Ethnic groups in Tanzania